Milton Historic District is a national historic district located at Milton, Northumberland County, Pennsylvania. It encompasses 719 contributing buildings in the central business district and surrounding residential areas of Milton.  

The buildings mostly date from the 1880s to the early 20th century; older buildings were largely lost due to a fire in 1880 and floods in 1972 and 1977.  Residential buildings are in a variety of architectural styles including Colonial Revival, Bungalow / American Craftsman, Queen Anne, and Richardsonian Romanesque.

Notable buildings include two surviving Federal style stone houses at 355 S. Front and 37 W. 4th, Methodist Episcopal Church (1882), First Presbyterian Church (1882), Hotel Milton, former Elk's Home, Sears Roebuck Building, former Dreifuss Brothers Store, Stetler Hotel, Milton Water Company Building (1890), Milton National Bank / Public Library, Masonic Temple (1930), U.S. Post Office, former Shimer Corporation works, Pennsylvania and Reading Freight Station, YMCA building, and Reid Tobacco Company.

It was added to the National Register of Historic Places in 1986.

References

Historic districts on the National Register of Historic Places in Pennsylvania
Buildings and structures in Northumberland County, Pennsylvania
National Register of Historic Places in Northumberland County, Pennsylvania